Paul Anthony Hull (born 17 May 1968) is an English former rugby union international full back.

He was head coach of Bristol between February 2009 and May 2011 and returned to the club in November 2013 to work as Chief Scout for two years. He is still involved in rugby as a Citing Officer working for the RFU and World Rugby. 

Currently he is a Housemaster and Director of Rugby at Prior Park College, Bath, but will be taking up an appointment as the RFU's Head of Professional Game Match Officials at the end of this academic year2020/21.

References

1968 births
Living people
Black British sportsmen
Bristol Bears players
England international rugby union players
English rugby union players
Royal Air Force rugby union players
Rugby union players from Lambeth
Rugby union fullbacks